The 2014 Kerry Senior Hurling Championship is the 113th staging of the Kerry Senior Hurling Championship since its establishment by the Kerry County Board in 1889. The championship began on 19 July 2014 and ended on 11 October 2014.

St. Brendan's were the defending champions, however, they were defeated in the semi-final after a replay. Lixnaw won the title following a 1-12 to 0-12 defeat of Kilmoyley in the final.

Fixtures and results

Round 1

Round 2A

Round 2B

Quarter-finals

Semi-finals

Final

Championship statistics

Miscellaneous

 During the championship decider, Lixnaw's Paul Galvin was attacked when a supporter ran on the field wielding a hurley. The pitch invader made contact with Galvin, although he did not require medical treatment and went on to play the full game.
 The final went to a replay for the second year in-a-row. It was the first time that the final was played on a Saturday.
 Lixnaw win the title for the first time since 2007.
 Crotta O'Neill's return having not played in the 2013 championship.

Top scorers
Overall

Single game

External links

 2014 Kerry Senior Hurling Championship

References

Kerry Senior Hurling Championship
Kerry Senior Hurling Championship